Hugo Banda Bernal (2 October 1916 – 4 July 1970) was a Mexican weightlifter. He competed in the men's lightweight event at the 1948 Summer Olympics.

References

External links
 

1916 births
1970 deaths
Mexican male weightlifters
Olympic weightlifters of Mexico
Weightlifters at the 1948 Summer Olympics
Sportspeople from Puebla
People from Puebla (city)
20th-century Mexican people